, also known as Homi Shirasawa, was a Japanese botanist who worked alongside Tomitaro Makino 'The Father of Japanese Botany', at the University of Tokyo. Shirasawa named numerous native plants, notably the endangered Picea koyamae and (with Makino) the Kyūshū Lime Tilia kiusiana.

References

Botanists active in Japan
20th-century Japanese botanists
1868 births
1947 deaths
Botanists with author abbreviations
19th-century Japanese botanists